The Sea Wolves is a 1980 war film starring Gregory Peck, Roger Moore and David Niven. The film, which is based on the 1978 book Boarding Party by James Leasor, is a fictionalised account of Operation Creek during the Second World War. In the covert mission, the Calcutta Light Horse, part of the Cavalry Reserve in the British Indian Army, successfully sank a German merchant ship in Mormugão Harbour in neutral Portugal's territory of Goa, India on 9 March 1943. The ship had a secret radio which was transmitting information about Allied shipping to U-boats operating in the Indian Ocean.

The film, which starred veteran American and British actors, was produced by Euan Lloyd and directed by Andrew V. McLaglen. Both had worked previously together on the successful 1978 British-Swiss war film The Wild Geese.

Plot
During World War II, U-boats are sinking thousands of tons of British merchant shipping in the Indian Ocean. British intelligence, based in India, believes that information is being passed to the U-boats by a radio transmitter hidden on board one of three German merchant ships interned in Goa, then a colony of Portugal. Since Portugal is neutral, the ships cannot be attacked by conventional forces.

The head of the Indian section of the Special Operations Executive (SOE) authorises attempts to kidnap and interrogate two known German agents, but these operations both fail. An approach is then made to a Territorial unit of British expatriates, the Calcutta Light Horse, to carry out the mission on its behalf. They all volunteer – all are trained in military skills and keen to 'do their bit'.

Whilst the volunteers are trained, Stewart and Cartwright travel covertly to Goa. By a mixture of blackmail and bribery, they arrange diversions on the night of the raid. A party is to be held in the Governor's palace, a brothel will offer free entry to sailors from ships in the port and a Carnival with fireworks will be held. Stewart has a brief affair with Mrs. Cromwell, a mysterious and socially well-connected woman, who turns out to be a German agent and the main conduit to the German 'Master Spy', known to the Germans and the British by the code-name Trompeta (Trumpet). She is eventually killed by Stewart, after she attempts to kill him but not before she's killed Jack Cartwright.

The raiding party sail around the coast in a decrepit and barely seaworthy barge; they set mines on the hull of the German ships in Goa. They then board one which is being used to transmit signals to U-boats, catching the depleted crew off-guard. Despite Pugh's order that there be no shooting, several German sailors are killed. The ship is set alight and the party withdraws, watching as the ship sinks.  The final scene shows a surfacing German U-boat which is expecting to hear a signal from the now sunken ship.

Differences from actual raid

While certain elements are faithful to the real-life raid, in reality the ships were not blown up by limpet mines but scuttled by their own crew. It is widely believed the intention was the capture of the ships rather than their destruction. Only four German crew died with the rest swimming ashore.

Cast

 Gregory Peck as Lieutenant-Colonel Lewis Henry Owain Pugh, Royal Artillery (who later rose to the rank of major-general) 
 Roger Moore as Captain Gavin Stewart (the real Gavin Stewart was a colonel)
 David Niven as Colonel W.H. Grice
 Trevor Howard as Jack Cartwright
 Barbara Kellerman as Mrs. Agnes Cromwell
 Patrick Macnee as Major 'Yogi' Crossley
 Kenneth Griffith as Wilton
 Patrick Allen as Colin Mackenzie
 Wolf Kahler as Trompeta
 Robert Hoffmann as U-boat Kapitän
 Dan van Husen as U-boat First Officer 
 George Mikell as Kapitän of Ehrenfels
 Jürgen Andersen as First Officer of Ehrenfels
 Bernard Archard as Underhill 
 Martin Benson as Mr. Montero 
 Faith Brook as Mrs. Doris Grice 
 Allan Cuthbertson as Dickie Melborne 
 Edward Dentith as Lumsdaine 
 Clifford Earl as Sloane 
 Vice Admiral RKS Ghandhi as the Governor 
 Percy Herbert as Dennison 
 Patrick Holt as Barker 
 Donald Houston as Hilliard 
 Glyn Houston as Peters 
 Victor Langley as Williamson 
 Terence Longdon as Malverne 
 Michael Medwin as Radcliffe 
 W. Morgan Sheppard as 'Patch' Lovecroft
 John Standing as Finley 
 Graham Stark as Don Manners 
 Keith Stevenson as Manuel 
 Jack Watson as Maclean 
 Moray Watson as Breene 
 Brook Williams as Butterworth 
 Marc Zuber as Ram Das Gupta
 Mohan Agashe as the Brothel Keeper

Production

Development
The film was originally known as Boarding Party. According to the documentary The Last of the Gentleman Producers, producer Euan Lloyd says that he originally planned to reunite Moore with Wild Geese co-stars Richard Burton and Richard Harris as Pugh and Grice.

Fifty percent of the budget was provided by Lorimar. They fell out with United Artists, their distributor, before the film was delivered. Lorimar subsequently formed a new relationship with Paramount but producer Euan Lloyd thought that studio regarded the film as "the poor cousin" and as a result it "wasn't sold properly".

Casting

The film reunited much of the cast and crew from 1978's The Wild Geese, including actors Roger Moore, Kenneth Griffith, Jack Watson, Percy Herbert, Patrick Allen, Brook Williams, Patrick Holt and Terence Longdon, writer Reginald Rose, producer Euan Lloyd, director Andrew V. McLaglen, designer Syd Cain, and composer Roy Budd.

Filming
Filming took place on location in Goa, India.

Soundtrack
The title music for The Sea Wolves was adapted by Roy Budd from the famous Warsaw Concerto of composer Richard Addinsell. Budd had, at the time, already composed or arranged numerous other film scores, notably those of The Wild Geese and Get Carter. For The Sea Wolves, Budd added lyrics by Leslie Bricusse to his, Budd's, arrangement of the Warsaw Concerto music, the resulting song being entitled The Precious Moments, sung by the British baritone Matt Monro, who had also sung title tracks for many other films.

Incidental music is from the Warsaw Concerto.

Reception
Film critic Robert Roten gave the film a "C+," and described it as "a workmanlike film told in a non-flashy, straightforward way, featuring an all-star cast."

References

External links

 
 
 
 
 
 Boarding Party by James Leasor, 1978, 2011. 
 O Espião Alemão em Goa: SOE operation "Longshanks", 2nd edition – José António Barreiros
 A comic movie poster of The Sea Wolves

1980 films
1980s historical films
1980s war films
British historical films
British war films
Films based on British novels
Films directed by Andrew McLaglen
Films set in Goa
Films set on ships
Films shot in England
Films shot in India
Paramount Pictures films
Seafaring films based on actual events
War adventure films
World War II films based on actual events
World War II naval films
Films with screenplays by Reginald Rose
Films scored by Roy Budd
Films shot in Goa
1980s English-language films
1980s British films